Derek Phillips may refer to:

 Derek Phillips (footballer, born 1975), American-born Trinidad and Tobago footballer
 Derek Phillips (New Zealand footballer), former football goalkeeper who represented New Zealand
 Derek Phillips (actor) (born 1976), American stage, screen, and television actor